The Constitutional Reform and Governance Act 2010 (c. 25), or CRAG Act, is an Act of the Parliament of the United Kingdom on UK constitutional law which affected the civil service and the ratification of treaties, and made other significant changes. It extends to all parts of the United Kingdom.

Commencements
The Act was passed on 8 April 2010, in the last days of Gordon Brown's premiership, and before the change of government that resulted from the general election on 6 May. Part 4 (tax status of MPs and members of the House of Lords) came into force immediately on the passing of the Act. Some of the Act's provisions were brought into force in April or May 2010 by a commencement order made on 15 April 2010 by Bridget Prentice, Parliamentary Under-Secretary of State (Ministry of Justice). 
Ministers of the incoming government made commencement orders for the Act's transitional and other provisions. Francis Maude, Minister for the Cabinet Office made the commencement order for Parts 1 (the civil service),  2 (ratification of treaties) and 5 (transparency of government financial reporting to Parliament) to come into force on 11 November 2010.

The Act

Treaty ratification
With regard to parliamentary approval for the ratification of treaties, Part II of the Act gave the Ponsonby Rule a statutory footing, but did not place the declaration of war and the deployment of the British armed forces onto a similar statutory footing, as was first intended when the bill came to Parliament, leaving them instead to the royal prerogative, as before. Part II's rules also do not apply to treaties involving the European Union as provisions for these are made in the European Parliamentary Elections Act 2002 and the European Union (Amendment) Act 2008.

In divisional court proceedings in the High Court of England and Wales, concerning the use of the royal prerogative for the issue of notification in accordance with Article 50 of the Treaty on European Union (the Lisbon Treaty) (R (Miller) v Secretary of State for Exiting the European Union), the Lord Chief Justice described the statutory procedure in Part 2 of the Act as "of critical importance".

Civil service
The Act put the civil service on a statutory footing for the first time. Its provisions include the establishment of a Civil Service Commission and a power for the Minister for the Civil Service to manage the civil service, and it provides for a requirement that appointments to the civil service are to be made on merit on the basis of fair and open competition. It also requires the Minister for the Civil Service to publish a code of conduct which provides that a special adviser (defined in section 15) may not authorise the expenditure of public funds, or exercise any power in relation to the management of any part of the civil service, or exercise any power under the royal prerogative; but the Act expressly states that the code need not require special advisers to carry out their duties with objectivity or impartiality.

The Institute for Government's publication Legislating for a Civil Service (2013) questioned the extent to which the Act had changed anything in practice, and commented that the legislation did not set out much about the structure or practice of Whitehall, unlike the Westminster-style systems of Australia, Canada and New Zealand, where more of how their civil services work was codified. It mentioned that, while all four systems have a commission to regulate appointments to the civil service, in Australia, for example, the specific text of the code of conduct is set out in primary legislation.

FOI exemption for royal family
Provisions of the Act that amended the Freedom of Information Act 2000 came into force on 19 January 2011. The commencement order was made by Kenneth Clarke (Ministry of Justice). It made information relating to communications with the sovereign, the heir or the second in line to the throne subject to an absolute exemption from disclosure, and made information relating to communications with other members of the royal family or the royal household subject to a qualified exemption.

Other provisions
A commencement order for transitional provisions was made in July 2010 by Mark Harper, (Parliamentary Secretary, Minister for Political and Constitutional Reform, in the Cabinet Office). Sections in Part 3 of the Act, for amending the Parliamentary Standards Act 2009, were brought into force in April−May 2010. As a result of the provisions concerning the tax status of members of either the House of Commons or the House of Lords (§§ 41−42 in Part 4), five life peers withdrew from the House of Lords in order to retain non-dom status for UK tax purposes:

See also
Constitution of the United Kingdom
Declaration of war by the United Kingdom

References

External links 
Text of the Act
List of votes
Parliament's role in ratifying treaties

United Kingdom Acts of Parliament 2010
Constitutional laws of the United Kingdom
Royal prerogative
Governance in the United Kingdom
Reform in the United Kingdom
Acts of the Parliament of the United Kingdom concerning the House of Lords
Civil Service (United Kingdom)